Casten Ned Nemra (born July 29, 1971) is a Marshallese politician who was President of the Marshall Islands for 17 days in January 2016. He was elected by the Nitijeļā (Parliament) as President in January 2016, following the 2015 general election, narrowly defeating Senator Alvin Jacklick, a seven-term member of Parliament, by a 17–16 vote. He was the youngest person to hold the job and the second commoner. He was ousted by a vote of no confidence after just two weeks in office by the opposition for jumping ship and joining Iroij Mike Kabua's Aelon Kein Ad party along with Senators Dennis Momotaro and Daisy-Alik Momotaro.

Early life and education
Nemra was born on July 29, 1971, in Ebeye, Kwajalein Atoll, Marshall Islands, which were part of the Trust Territory of the Pacific Islands at the time. He was educated at Assumption High School, a Roman Catholic school in Majuro. Nemra received a Bachelor of Business Administration from Portland State University in 2000.

Career
Nemra served as the Budget Director for Office of International Development Assistance from 2001 to 2004. He then served as Assistant Secretary for the Ministry of Finance from 2004 to 2007. Nemra was next appointed the Chief Secretary of the Republic of the Marshall Islands from 2008 until 2015.

Nemra was elected as a Senator in the Nitijeļā in the 2015 general election, representing the Jaluit Atoll constituency in the Ralik Chain.

Since January 2020, he has been the foreign minister of the Marshall Islands. As foreign minister, he highlighted that the Marshallese government and people "have no intention to relocate" or become climate refugees. He said in April 2021 that the Marshallese are on the islands to stay.

Personal life
Nemra is married to Terry Paul Nemra, the former First Lady of the Marshall Islands. The couple have four children. A resident of Jaluit Atoll, Nemra speaks both English and Marshallese.

References

1971 births
Living people
Foreign Ministers of the Marshall Islands
Members of the Legislature of the Marshall Islands
Oregon State University alumni
People from the Ralik Chain
Presidents of the Marshall Islands
Marshallese Roman Catholics
21st-century Marshallese politicians